Donus may refer to:
 Donus (beetle), a genus of beetles in the tribe Hyperini
 Pope Donus (died 678)